Trouble at the Henhouse is the fifth studio album by Canadian rock  band The Tragically Hip, released in 1996.

The song "Butts Wigglin'" appeared in the 1996 film Kids in the Hall: Brain Candy.

Commercial and critical performance
The album debuted at #1 on the Canadian Albums Chart, and stayed at #1 for four straight weeks. The album has been certified 5× platinum in Canada. By March 1997, the album had sold 650,000 units in Canada. It peaked at No. 134 on the Billboard 200. Trouble at the Henhouse peaked at #80 in the Netherlands.

The Encyclopedia of Popular Music deemed the album "reliably melodic." The Washington Post wrote that "a surprisingly large number of these songs are more atmospheric than aggressive." Trouser Press wrote that "too much of Henhouse finds the Hip wallowing in meandering psychedelica, and too many of the slower songs ('Sherpa,' 'Flamenco,' 'Put It Off') sound too much alike." The Orlando Sentinel praised Gord Downie's ability to pen lyrics that "found beauty in the tiny wonders of life while exploring big questions of existence."

The album won Album of the Year and North Star Rock Album of the Year at the 1997 Juno Awards.

Track listing
All songs written by The Tragically Hip.

The Tragically Hip
Gord Downie – lead vocals
Rob Baker – lead guitar
Paul Langlois – rhythm guitar
Gord Sinclair – bass guitar, backing vocals
Johnny Fay – drums

References

1996 albums
The Tragically Hip albums
MCA Records albums
Juno Award for Rock Album of the Year albums
Juno Award for Album of the Year albums